Cisitalia was an Italian sports and racing car brand. The name "Cisitalia" derives from "Compagnia Industriale Sportiva Italia", a business conglomerate founded in Turin in 1946 and controlled by the wealthy industrialist and sportsman Piero Dusio.  The Cisitalia 202 GT of 1946 is well known in the world as a "rolling sculpture".

Cisitalia D46

Using Fiat street car parts as a base Dante Giacosa designed the D46 which made its successful debut in 1946. Giacosa had a vast knowledge of Fiat bits and pieces as he had designed the legendary 500 Fiat Topolino before WWII. The engine and suspension were directly derived from the small Fiat but extensively modified for street and racing. The engine received dry sump lubrication and further tweaks considerably increased the power output to 60-70 bhp. With a spaceframe chassis and weighing under  the available power was more than enough for competitive performance.  Dusio's dream of a one model series came to nothing, but instead his D46s started to dominate the voiturette series. Highly talented drivers like Tazio Nuvolari piloted the D46 to multiple successes against more advanced but older racing cars.

Cisitalia Grand Prix

This successes led to a much more ambitious single seater project that would prove too much for the small company despite some non racing sales. Ferdinand Porsche was commissioned to design and construct a full Grand Prix car which led to the innovative but complex Cisitalia 360.  With a mid engined layout and four wheel drive the Type 360 was far too expensive for Dusio to support and the attempt essentially killed any further racing cars with only the street legal cars surviving the cut.

Cisitalia 202

Dusio commissioned several automobiles from Europe's leading designers. He provided Pinin Farina with the chassis, on which an aluminum body was handcrafted. When first presented to the public at the Villa d'Este Gold Cup show in Como, Italy, and at the 1947 Paris Motor Show, the two-seat 202GT was a resounding success. The 202 was an aesthetic and technical achievement that transformed postwar automobile body design. The Pinin Farina design was honored by New York's Museum of Modern Art in 1951. In the MOMA's first exhibit on automotive design, called "Eight Automobiles", the Cisitalia was displayed with seven other cars (1930 Mercedes-Benz SS tourer, 1939 Bentley saloon with coachwork by James Young, 1939 Talbot-Lago by Figoni teardrop coupé, 1951 Willys Jeep, 1937 Cord 812 Custom Beverly Sedan, 1948 MG TC, and the 1941 Lincoln Continental coupe). It is still part of the MoMA permanent collection. It was not, however, a commercial success; because it was coachbuilt, it was expensive, and only 170 were produced between 1947 and 1952. Most cars were coachbuilt by Pinin Farina with some by Vignale and Stabilimenti Farina.

Building on aerodynamic studies developed for racing cars, the Cisitalia offers one of the most accomplished examples of coachwork conceived as a single shell. The hood, body, fenders, and headlights are integral to the continuously flowing surface, rather than added on. Before the Cisitalia, the prevailing approach followed by automobile designers when defining a volume and shaping the shell was to treat each part of the body as a separate, distinct element—a box to house the passengers, another for the motor, and headlights as appendages. In the Cisitalia, there are no sharp edges. Swellings and depressions maintain the overall flow and unity, creating a sense of speed.

The 202 is featured in the 2011 video game L.A. Noire by Rockstar Games and Team Bondi as a secret car called the Cisitalia Coupe.

Cisitalia 202 MM

Since the 202 never made large scale production and all the cars were handmade, the small talented group at Cisitalia, including Carlo Abarth, Dante Giacosa and Giovanni Savonuzzi, made several variants of the 202. Of the more important versions, the SMM Nuvolari Spider was built and named after a class victory at the 1947 Mille Miglia by famed driver Tazio Nuvolari. It is easily identified by its large rear fins, twin windscreens and usual Italian red paint scheme.

In total, around 200 cars were made which made a large impact on the later marques, including Abarth's later range of cars.

Cisitalia 202 SMM
For the upcoming 1947 season, Giovanni Savonuzzi, who had designed most of the 202, sketched a coupe body for Cisitalia's competition car. The design was executed by Stabilimenti Farina upon both chassis #101 and #102. After two coupes had been finished, a spider version, Called the SMM for Spider Mille Miglia, was completed which would adorn all subsequent competition cars bearing the MM designation.

At the 1947 Mille Miglia, the Cisitalia spider really proved itself by leading most of the race in capable hands of Tazio Nuvolari. Despite having competition with engines three times larger, Nuvolari held back the competition until troubles ensued in the rain. In the end, the Cisitalia took second overall and first in class. For this epic effort, subsequent competition spiders were known as 202 SMM Nuvolaris.

Since the 202 SMM received much attention at the Mille Miglia, Stabilimenti Farina continued production of the design for several customers. In total around 20 cars were made very similar to Nuvolari's winning car.

Complete Formula One World Championship results 
(key) (results in bold indicate pole position; results in italics indicate fastest lap)

Models

 D46 Monoposto
 D47 Monoposto
 D48 Monoposto
 Grand Prix
 202SMM Spyder Nuvolari
 202SC
 202C Coupé
 202C Cabriolet
 202 Streamliner
 202 MM Razzo
 202 Giacossa
 202 Cassone
 204 Spyder Sport
 360 Grand Prix
 808 XF coupé and roadster
 202D Coupé and Spyder
 303 DF Spyder
 303 DF Coupé
 33DF Voloradente
 DF85 Coupé
 750GT
 505 DF (by Ghia, 10 examples)

References

External links

Cisitalia Museum
Museum of Modern Art New York
Cisitalia Club of North America

 
Defunct motor vehicle manufacturers of Italy
Formula One constructors
Formula One entrants
Italian auto racing teams
Italian racecar constructors
Turin motor companies
Vehicle manufacturing companies established in 1946
Italian companies established in 1946
Sports car manufacturers
Vehicle manufacturing companies disestablished in 1963
1963 disestablishments in Italy
Auto racing teams established in 1946
Auto racing teams disestablished in 1963